Lynn Morley Martin (born Judith Lynn Morley; December 26, 1939) is an American businesswoman and former politician who served as the 21st United States secretary of labor from 1991 to 1993, under President George H. W. Bush. A member of the Republican Party, she previously represented  in the United States House of Representatives from 1981 to 1991. Before her election to Congress, Martin served in both chambers of 
Illinois General Assembly; in the State House of Representatives from 1977 to 1979, as well as the State Senate from 1979 to 1980 .

Early life and career
Martin was born in Evanston, Illinois, the daughter of Helen Catherine (Hall) and Lawrence William Morley, an accountant. She attended Taft High School in Chicago from 1952 to 1956. She was later named to Taft's Hall of Fame. In 1960 she graduated from the University of Illinois, where she was a member of the Gamma Phi Beta sorority. After becoming a teacher in the Rockford Public School District, she continued in that job after being elected to public office, serving as a member of the Winnebago County board from 1972 to 1976 before being elected to the Illinois House of Representatives (1977–79), Illinois Senate (1979–80), and U.S. House of Representatives (1981–91).

U.S. House of Representatives
She ran for the House, after Representative John B. Anderson retired to run for president in 1980. She won a competitive four-way Republican primary for the open seat. Martin's ran on a platform that was fiscally conservative, lower taxes and business deregulation, and socially liberal, pro-choice and advocating for the Equal Rights Amendment.

In the U.S. House, she was vice chair of the House Republican Conference. She was the first woman to be elected to a position in the Republican House Leadership. During her time in Congress, Martin served on the Armed Services Committee, the Budget Committee, and the House Rules Committee. Martin earned the nickname "the Axe" for her efforts to reduce spending while serving on the House Budget Committee. On a number of important issues she split with Republicans: arguing for a minimum wage increase, voting to override President Reagan's 1986 veto of a sanctions bill against the apartheid regime in South Africa, joining with Democrats to stiffen punishment for white-collar criminals, and supporting pro-choice legislation.

A loyalist to the Reagan Administration, she assisted then-Vice President George H. W. Bush with his preparation for the 1984 Vice Presidential debate against Geraldine Ferraro. She brought an unexpected attacking and aggressive style out of the gates in the mock debates, throwing the Vice President off balance and convincing him that he needed to take Ferraro more seriously and prepare more. Martin also was tapped to deliver Bush's nominating speech at the Republican National Convention in Dallas. Bush touted her as a possible running mate in his 1988 presidential campaign, though he eventually selected Indiana Senator Dan Quayle.

Martin entered the race for the vacant Republican Conference Chair position, following Dick Cheney of Wyoming's decision to run for Whip spot, the second highest leadership position. Martin lost her bid to Jerry Lewis of California by a slim margin of three votes after conservative hardliners mounted a coordinated campaign against her, in part, for her stances on social issues.

1990 Senate Run

Martin ran for the U.S. Senate in 1990 against Democratic incumbent Paul Simon. She was considered a formidable challenger, but her campaign floundered – in ads, Martin poked fun at Simon's signature bow tie, but the humorous ad campaign was seen by some as petty and mean-spirited. Martin's campaign suffered from poor fundraising as well, being outspent by Simon by a margin of two-to-one. Simon's popularity proved too much to overcome, and he won with 65 percent of the vote, carrying all but two counties in the state; Edwards County in the southeast and McHenry County outside Chicago, in the heart of the district Martin represented for most of the 1980s. In a midterm favorable to Democrats, Martin was further hurt by negative campaign tactics deployed by advisor Roger Ailes, as well as a number of gaffes. Including, referencing downstate voters as "rednecks". Martin raised the most campaign funds out of any Republican Senate challenger that cycle.

Secretary of Labor
Martin was tapped to be Secretary of Labor in the George H. W. Bush administration  when Elizabeth Dole resigned to become president of the American Red Cross. Martin was confirmed as Secretary of Labor by the Senate on January 22, 1991, by a vote of 94–0. During her tenure, Martin promoted programs that would help produce a highly skilled workforce. Martin's signature policy while Secretary was the promotion of her Glass Ceiling Commission. Martin pushed for greater representation of women and minorities in the corporate world and was crusader against sexual harassment in the work place.

At the 1992 Republican National Convention, Secretary Martin was selected to give the nominating address for president to George H. W. Bush.

Post political career
From 1993 to 1999, Martin was a professor at the Kellogg School of Management at Northwestern University, and chair of the Council for the Advancement of Women and advisor to the firm of Deloitte & Touche LLP, for Deloitte's internal human resources and minority advancement matters. She was briefly a fellow at Harvard University's Kennedy School of Government.

In 1993, Martin was among the finalist to be named as Commissioner of Baseball, but the job ultimately went to Bud Selig.

In 1995, she tested the waters to run for the 1996 Republican presidential nomination, but decided against it after concluding there was insufficient support for her candidacy. She participated in a Republican primary debate in New Hampshire on local television. Arguably, she would have been the most viable woman to run for the Republican presidential nomination in history to that date.

Martin has been a director on the boards of AT&T Corporation, Ryder System Inc., Dreyfus Funds, Constellation Energy Group and Procter & Gamble. She served as chairman of the board of the Lincoln Park Zoo in Chicago.

She is briefly mentioned in The Loudest Voice for her connection to future Fox News executive Roger Ailes.

Personal life
She married John Martin in 1960 and the couple had two daughters. They divorced in 1978. Martin remarried in 1987 to Harry Leinenweber, a U.S. District Court Judge. She has five stepchildren.

Awards 
Lynn Morley Martin was inducted as a laureate of The Lincoln Academy of Illinois and awarded the Order of Lincoln (the State's highest honor) by Illinois Governor George Ryan in 2000 in the area of government.

See also
List of female United States Cabinet members
Women in the United States House of Representatives

References

External links

|-

|-

|-

|-

1939 births
Living people
20th-century American politicians
20th-century American women politicians
George H. W. Bush administration cabinet members
County board members in Illinois
Female members of the United States House of Representatives
Republican Party Illinois state senators
Republican Party members of the Illinois House of Representatives
Northwestern University faculty
Politicians from Rockford, Illinois
Republican Party members of the United States House of Representatives from Illinois
United States Secretaries of Labor
University of Illinois Urbana-Champaign alumni
Women members of the Cabinet of the United States
Women state legislators in Illinois